Cinemaware was a video game developer and publisher. It had released several titles in the 1980s based on various film themes. The company was resurrected in 2000, before being acquired by eGames in 2005.

Cinemaware Corp. (1986–1991) 
The company was founded in January 1986 by Phyllis and Robert “Bob” Jacob. Cinemaware's first title was Defender of the Crown, a strategy computer game originally released for the Commodore Amiga. Bob Jacob was a film buff, and Cinemaware released other games based on classic film genres which were made as an attempt to emphasize action, graphics, and ease of play.  Its games generally debuted on the most graphically powerful home computers of the era, the Amiga, Apple IIGS, and Atari ST, and then ported to others, such as the Commodore 64, PC (running under MS-DOS), and the Nintendo Entertainment System. Defender of the Crown is the most ported Cinemaware game.

Cinemaware expanded to sports games, with its "TV Sports" line, which featured elements of sports telecasts such as studio announcers. The "TV Sports" line covered basketball, ice hockey, and football. Some of the titles were only known by the generic name "TV Sports" in Europe such asTV Sports: Boxing and TV Sports: Baseball, which were released in the United States by Data East as ABC Wide World of Sports Boxing and Bo Jackson Baseball, respectively.

By 1990, the NEC owned 15% of Cinemaware. Cinemaware went bankrupt in 1991. While porting S.D.I. to another system, one of the company's owners demanded the programmers add more features, increasing the programming time and delaying the product's release. Coupled with falling sales of their other titles amid an economic downturn, the company suffered. The company also suffered from software piracy, threatening to stop publishing Amiga games at several points because of the ease by which video games could be copied. Many of their games, including Wings, were cracked and spread amongst gamers before release.

Releases 
Cinemaware's titles include the following:

 Defender of the Crown (swashbuckling movies; 1986, Apple IIGS, Amiga, Atari ST, Commodore 64, ZX Spectrum, Amstrad CPC, MS-DOS, Macintosh, CD-I)
 S.D.I. (Cold War era space drama; 1986, Amiga, Atari ST, Amstrad CPC, ZX Spectrum, MS-DOS, Macintosh)
 The King of Chicago (inspired by mob movies; 1987, Apple IIGS, Amiga, Atari ST, MS-DOS, Macintosh)
 Sinbad and the Throne of the Falcon (Sinbad and Arabian nights movies; 1987, Apple IIGS, Amiga, Atari ST, Commodore 64, MS-DOS)
 The Three Stooges (The Three Stooges short subjects; 1987, Apple IIGS, Amiga, Commodore 64, MS-DOS)
 Rocket Ranger (1950s science fiction serials; 1988, Apple IIGS, Amiga, Atari ST, Commodore 64, MS-DOS)
 TV Sports: Football (1988, Amiga, Atari ST, Commodore 64, MS-DOS, TG-16)
 Lords of the Rising Sun (Japanese Samurai movies; 1988, Amiga, Atari ST, MS-DOS, TG-16, CD-I)
 Disney's Cartoon Arcade (1989 Viewmaster Interactive Vision)
 It Came from the Desert (1950s science fiction/monster movies; 1989, Amiga, Atari ST, Mega Drive, TG-16, MS-DOS)
 The Kristal (1989, Amiga, Atari ST, MS-DOS)
 TV Sports: Baseball (1989, Amiga)
 TV Sports: Basketball (1990, Amiga, MS-DOS)
 Antheads: It Came from the Desert 2 (1990, Amiga)
 Wings (World War I movies; 1990, Amiga)
 TV Sports: Boxing (1991, Amiga, MS-DOS)

Cinemaware Inc. (2000–2005) 
Lars Fuhrken-Batista later bought the Cinemaware trademark and associated intellectual property, founding Cinemaware Inc. in 2000. Cinemaware developed recreations of its past titles, updated for Microsoft Windows and the Apple Macintosh. Dubbed the "Digitally Remastered" editions, these games feature the same gameplay as the originals, but with updated graphics. They also ported some of their older games to handheld systems, such as the Game Boy Advance. On their website, they have also released disk images of their original titles for use with emulators and some are emulated via Macromedia Shockwave.

The new Cinemaware developed newer versions of their classic games. Their first game in this endeavor was Robin Hood: Defender of the Crown, featuring an improved 3D engine and was released in September 2003 for Windows, PlayStation 2, and Xbox. Since the 1.02 patch for Robin Hood: Defender of the Crown in December 2003, Cinemaware has made no official announcements for its other games. One developer made a statement in the website's forums in October 2004 stating Cinemaware is still working on these projects, but no other announcements have been made since.

Releases 
 Robin Hood: Defender of the Crown (2003, PS2, Xbox, Windows)
 Defender of the Crown (2002, GBA)
 The Three Stooges (GBA, PlayStation)
 Wings (2003, GBA)
 Defender of the Crown: Digitally Remastered Edition (Windows, Macintosh)
 The Three Stooges: Digitally Remastered Edition (2002, Windows, Mac)
 Wings: Digitally Remastered Edition (postponed, Windows, Mac)
 Lords of the Rising Sun: Digitally Remastered Edition (postponed, Windows, Mac)
 Wings Remastered (2014, Windows, Mac)

Acquisition 

On October 6, 2005, Cinemaware was acquired by predominantly family-oriented game publisher eGames, Inc., and Lars Furken-Batista became Vice President of Development. Shortly after the acquisition, eGames announced the launch of Cinemaware Marquee, a publishing label to be used to bring new games to the U.S. market. Their first published game was Space Rangers 2, a critically acclaimed space adventure. Under their new label, they have brought Darwinia from Introversion Software, Moscow to Berlin from Monte Cristo, and Neighbours from Hell: On Vacation and Buccaneer's Bounty from German publisher Ascaron to the American market. In 2007, eGames released an Adobe Flash version of Defender of the Crown, allowing more users to play the game. The website was titled Defender of the Crown: Heroes Live Forever.

Cinemaware rights acquisition by Starbreeze (2016) 
In May 2016, Swedish game developer and publisher Starbreeze acquired all Cinemaware intellectual property rights from Cinemaware.

 The Cinemaware brand
 Defender of the Crown
 Wings
 The King of Chicago
 Sinbad and the Throne of the Falcon
 Lords of the Rising Sun
 Rocket Ranger
 It Came from the Desert
 Antheads: It Came from the Desert 2
 S.D.I.
 TV Sports: Basketball
 TV Sports: Baseball
 TV Sports: Boxing
 TV Sports: Football
 TV Sports: Hockey

The rights include all brands, websites, existing products, and licenses including the Cinemaware label.

References

External links 
Official website (archived via Wayback Machine)

1985 establishments in California
1991 disestablishments in California
2000 establishments in California
2005 disestablishments in California
 
Companies based in Burlingame, California
Defunct companies based in the San Francisco Bay Area
Defunct video game companies of the United States
Re-established companies
Software companies based in the San Francisco Bay Area
Video game companies based in California
Video game companies established in 1985
Video game companies disestablished in 1991
Video game companies established in 2000
Video game companies disestablished in 2005
Video game development companies